The Arab Table tennis Clubs Championship is a sport competition for table tennis clubs, currently held annually and organized by the Arab table tennis Association. it played for the first time in 1989.

History 

The Arab Table tennis Clubs Championship is a sport competition for table tennis clubs, currently held annually and organized by the Arab table tennis Association. it played for the first time in 1989.

Results

Winners by club

Winners by country

References

Table tennis competitions
Recurring sporting events established in 1989